OpenProject is a web-based project management system for location-independent team collaboration.

This free open-source application is released under the GNU (General Public License) Version 3 (GPLv3) and is available as a community edition and a chargeable Enterprise Edition. Development is mostly done by OpenProject GmbH.

In addition to numerous smaller OpenProject installations, there are some very large installations in global organizations with more than 2,500 projects.

Features
 Bug tracking
 Document management
 Forum
 Project news
 Project timelines
 Issue tracking or issue management
 Project management and milestones
 Time tracking
 Wiki

OpenProject Foundation
The OpenProject Foundation was established by OpenProject's developers and users in October 2012. After founding the association in April 2013, it was registered (VR 32487) in June in the register of the Amtsgericht (local court) of Charlottenburg-Wilmersdorf (district of Berlin).

The association provides an organizational framework for technical decisions and the propagation, acceleration, and perpetuation of development by the worldwide community and by a full-time development team, funded by the members of the OpenProject Foundation.

The association aims at the following objectives:
 establishing and promoting an active and open community of developers, users, and companies for continuously developing the open-source project collaboration software OpenProject;
 defining and developing the project vision, the code of conduct, and principles of the application;
 creating development policies and ensuring their compliance;
 defining and evolving the development and quality assurance processes;
 providing the source code to the public;
 providing and operating the OpenProject platform.

The association does not pursue economic goals of its own.

History
OpenProject has been developed since 2010 along with its ancestor project ChiliProject. The initial motivation for this fork was the OPF founding members' performance, security, and accessibility requirements, which could not be easily reached by plugins for either Redmine or ChiliProject.

Recent and further developments
The current release schedule and future development roadmap can be observed and discussed on the OpenProject development platform.

Besides the development of new functions, the following technical objectives are pursued in the context of refactoring:
 develop a new API v3;
 rebuild the work package module with AngularJS as a single-page application;
 rebuild the CSS structure using the CSS framework Foundation for Apps.

Awards
In August 2011, OpenProject won the first prize in the category "Best Practice" of the open source competition of the Berlin Technology Foundation "Berlin's future is open".

In April 2018, OpenProject won the INNOVATIONSPREIS-IT 2018 of the Initiative Mittelstand in the category Open Source.

In October 2018, OpenProject won the Open Source Business Award (OSBAR, "OpenSource-Oscar") in silver.

See also
 Comparison of project management software

References

External links
 

Bug and issue tracking software
Collaborative software
Cross-platform free software
Free project management software
Free software programmed in Ruby
Free wiki software